Topia is a city and seat of the municipality of Topia, in the state of Durango, north-western Mexico.

Topia may also refer to:
 Topia Municipality, one of the municipalities in the state of Durango, north-western Mexico 
 Thopia family, one of the most powerful Albanian feudal families in the Late Middle Ages
 Tanusio Thopia
 Karl Thopia
 George Thopia
 Helena Thopia
 Niketa Thopia
 Andrea Thopia
 Tanush Thopia
 Tane Topia (born 1976), New Zealand cricketer

See also

 Thopia (disambiguation)
Tosia, name